= Fulani architecture =

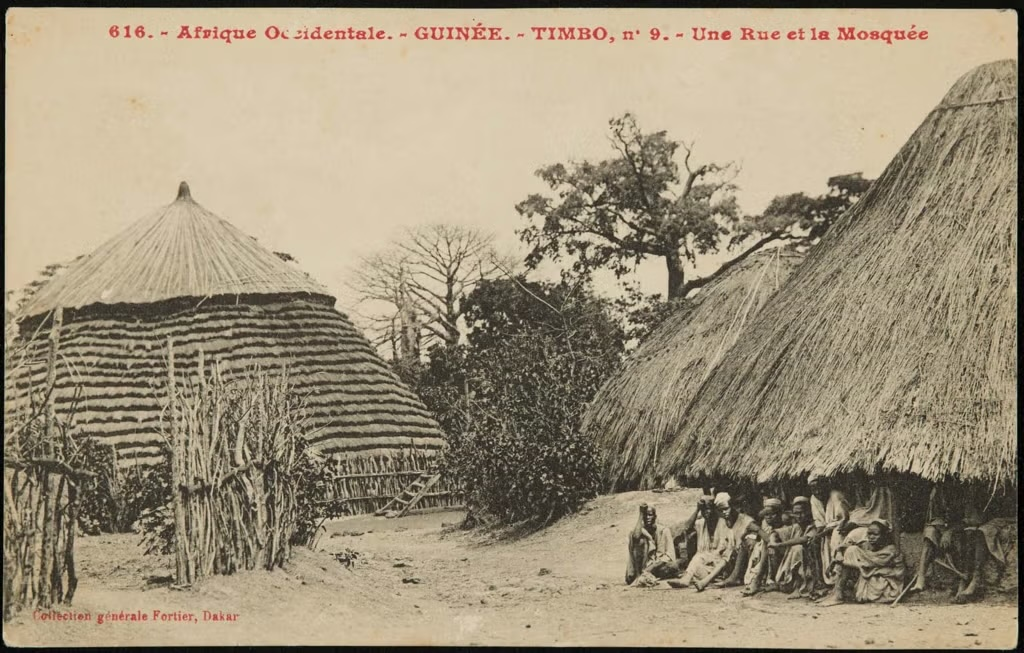
Timbo Mosque

Fulani architecture is the architecture of the Fula people, who primarily live in West Africa and the Sahel. Fulani architecture differs depending on the community, as Fula communities vary between nomadic, sedentary, and semi nomadic lifestyles.

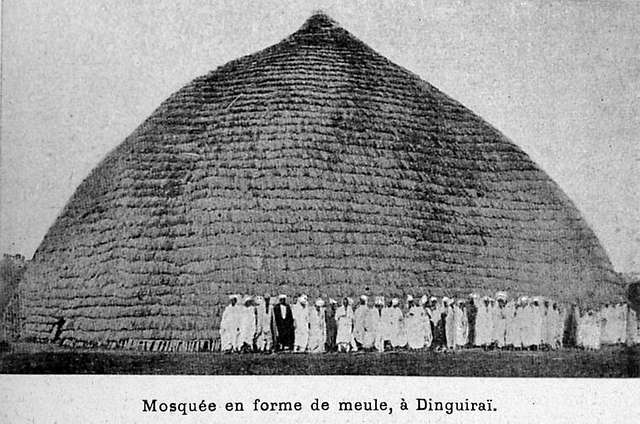
Dinguirai Mosque

== Settled Fulani architecture ==
Settled Fula communities build permanent buildings, usually made of mud and earth. The buildings have thatched roofs, often enclosed with a fence. Traditional mosques like the Dingueraye mosque, combine Fulani architectural styles with islamic influences.

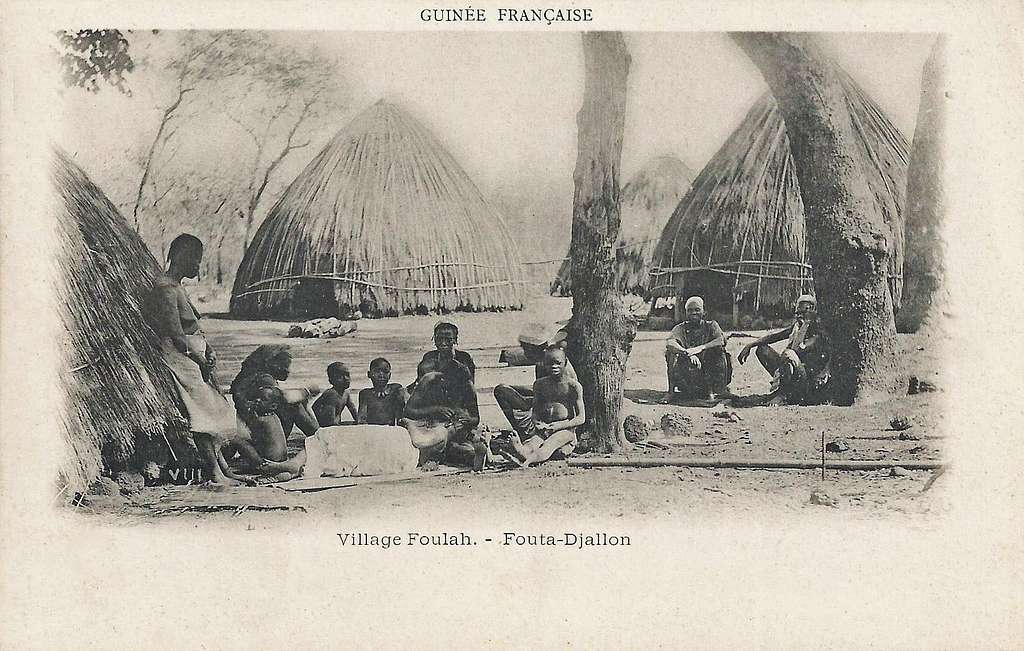
Fula village in Fouta djallon

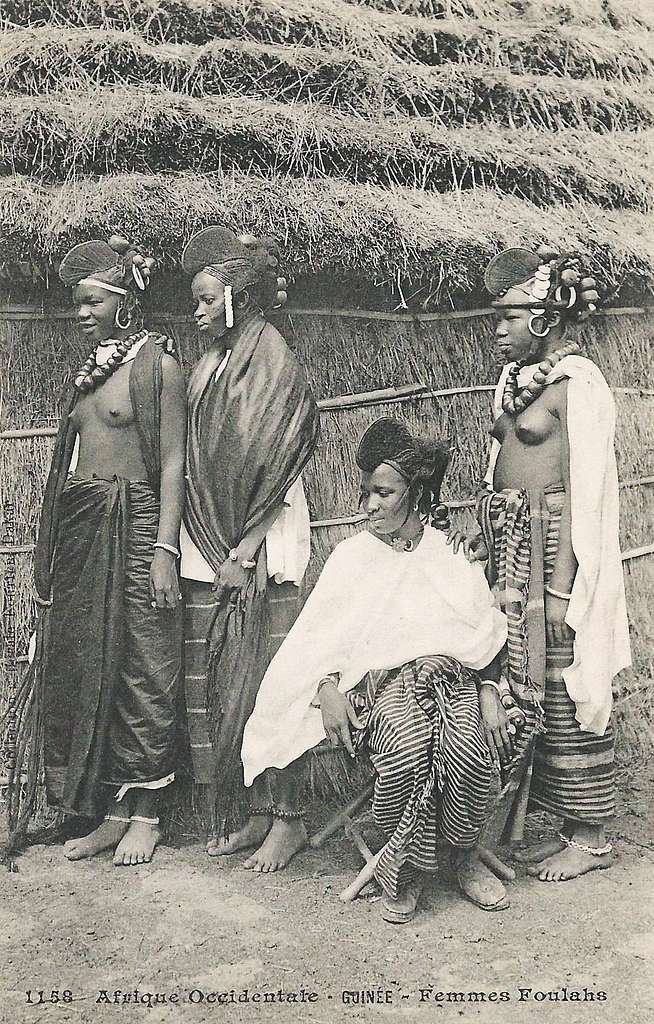
Fula people in front of a hut

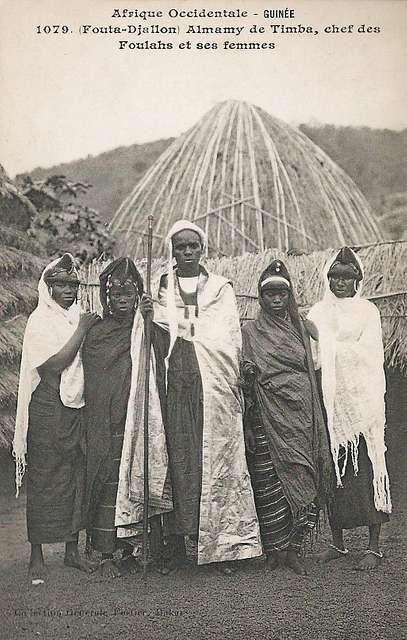
Fula people standing in front of a building, potentially a mosque

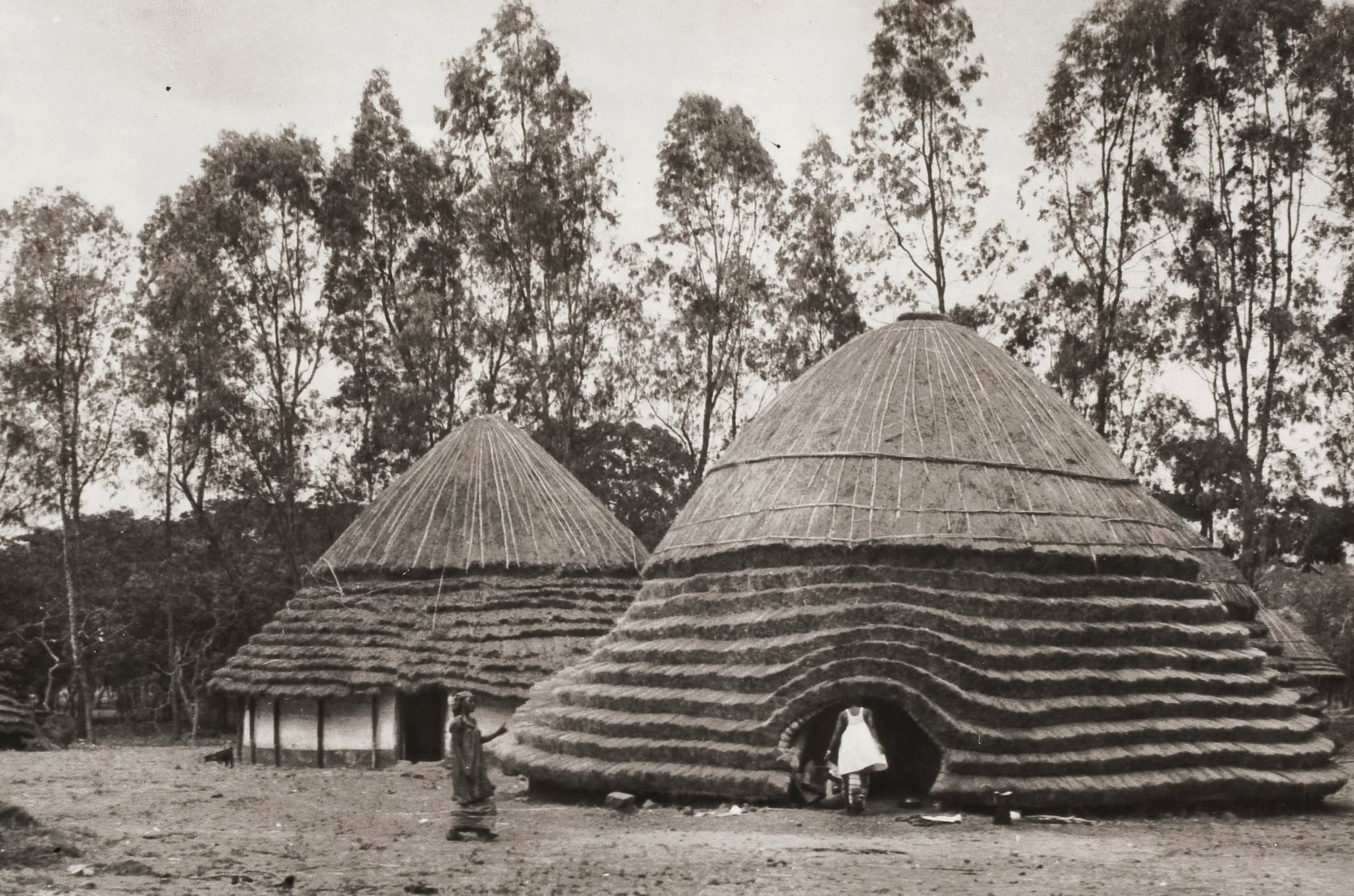
Traditional Fulani architecture

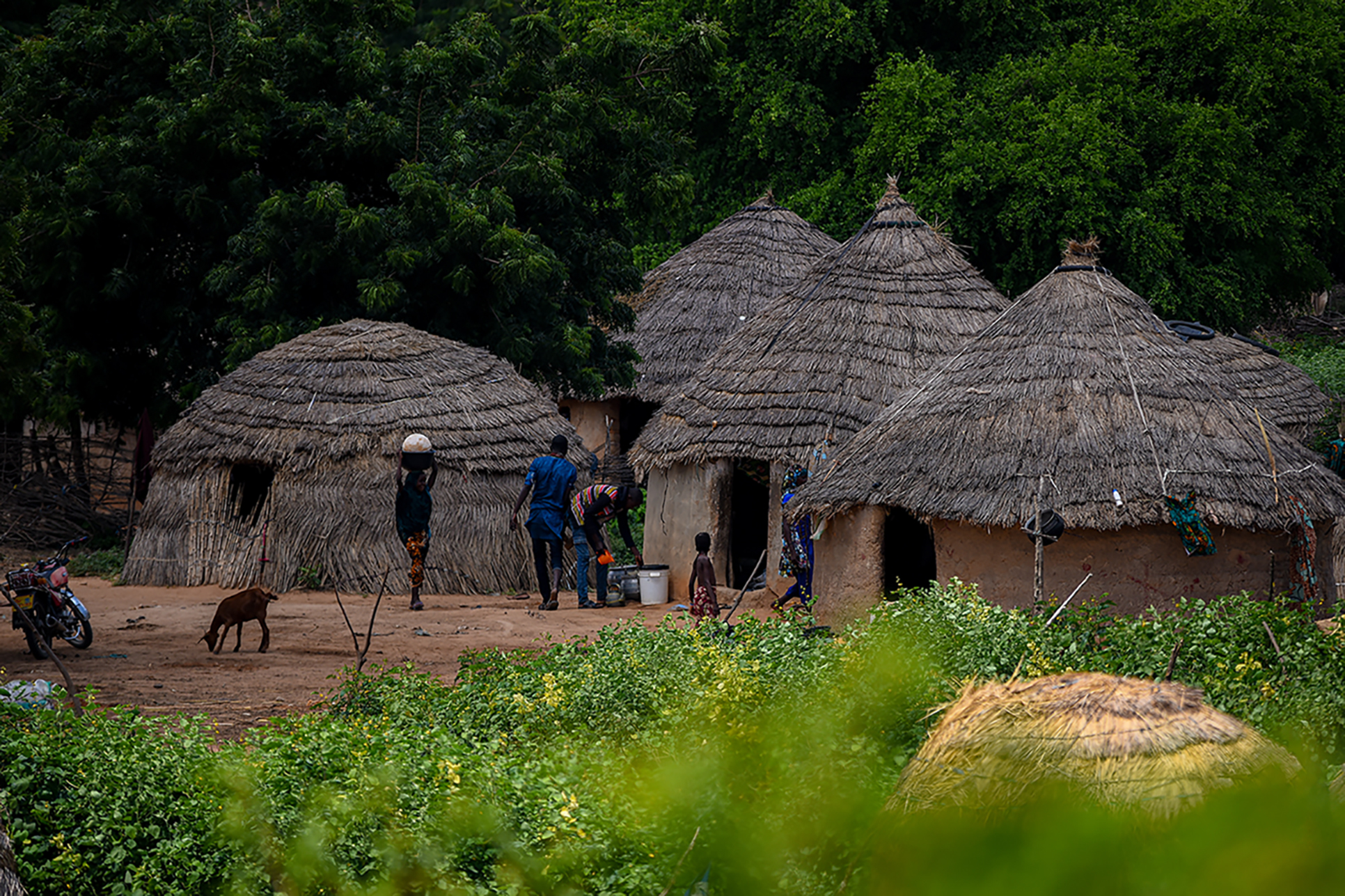
Fulani Settlement

== Nomadic Fulani architecture ==
Nomadic Fula communities usually use movable shelters made of woven grass and mud, and smaller buildings, as they are always moving with their livestock.

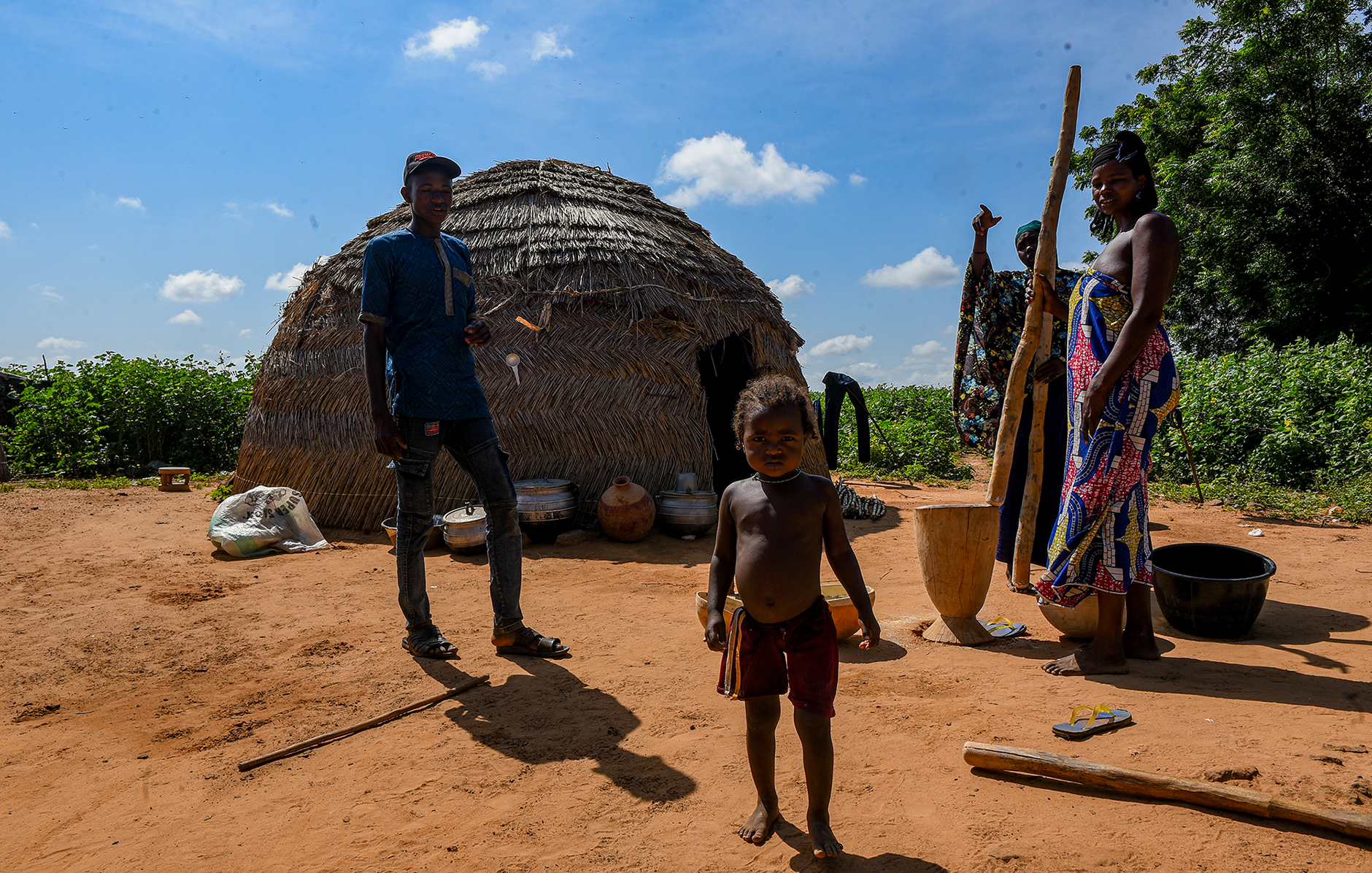
Fulani family, moveable shelter

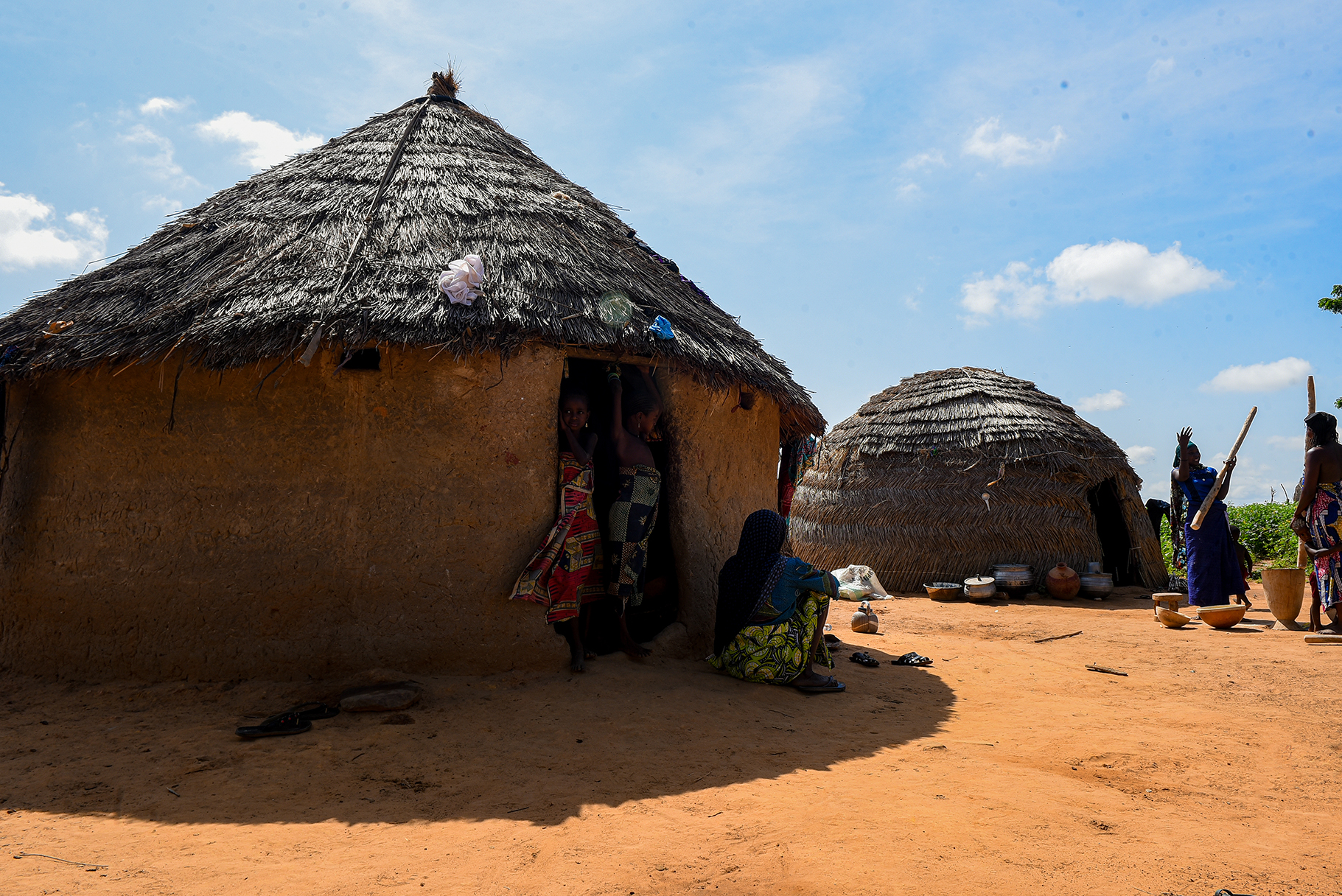
Fulani moveable shelter

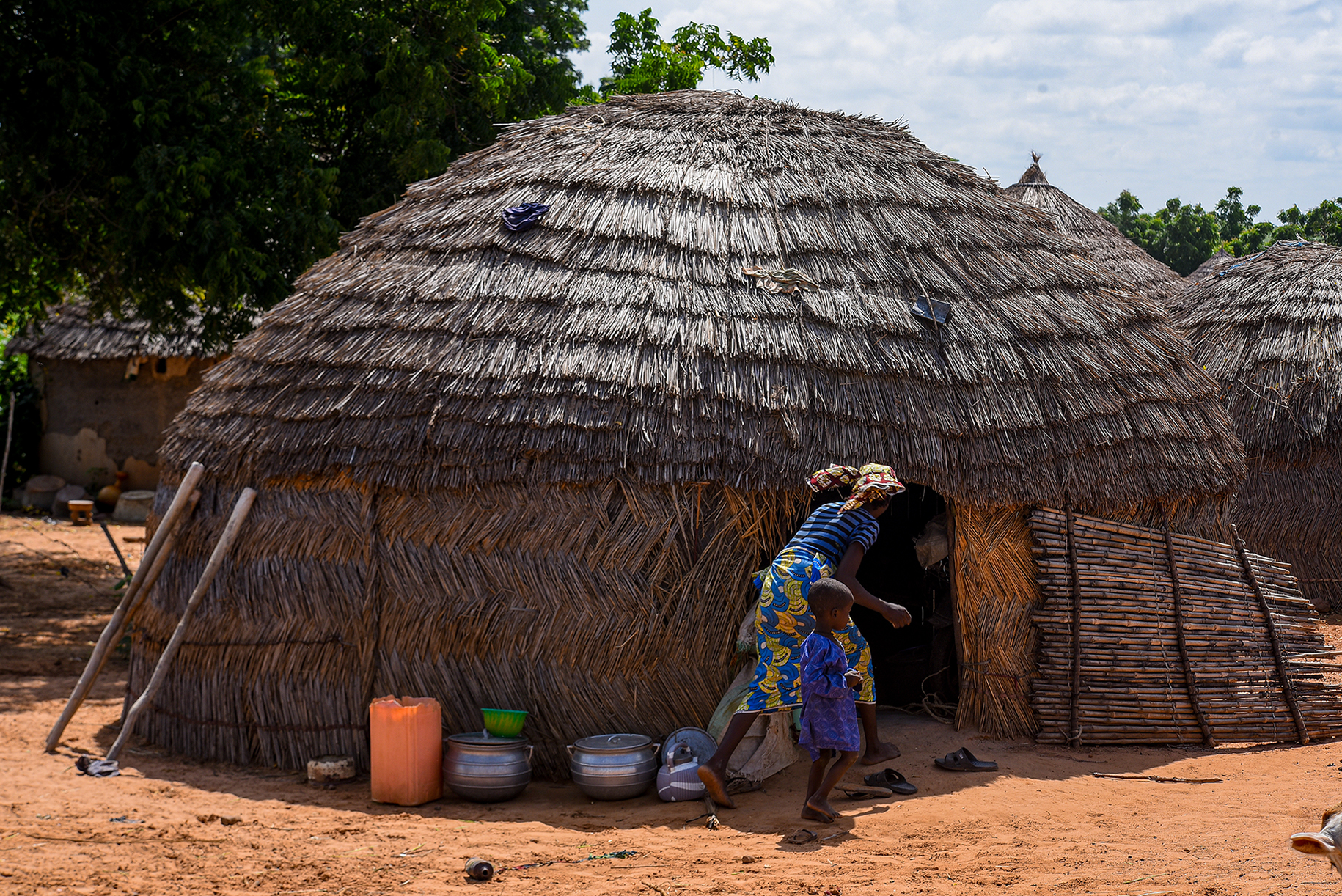
Fulani Moveable shelter

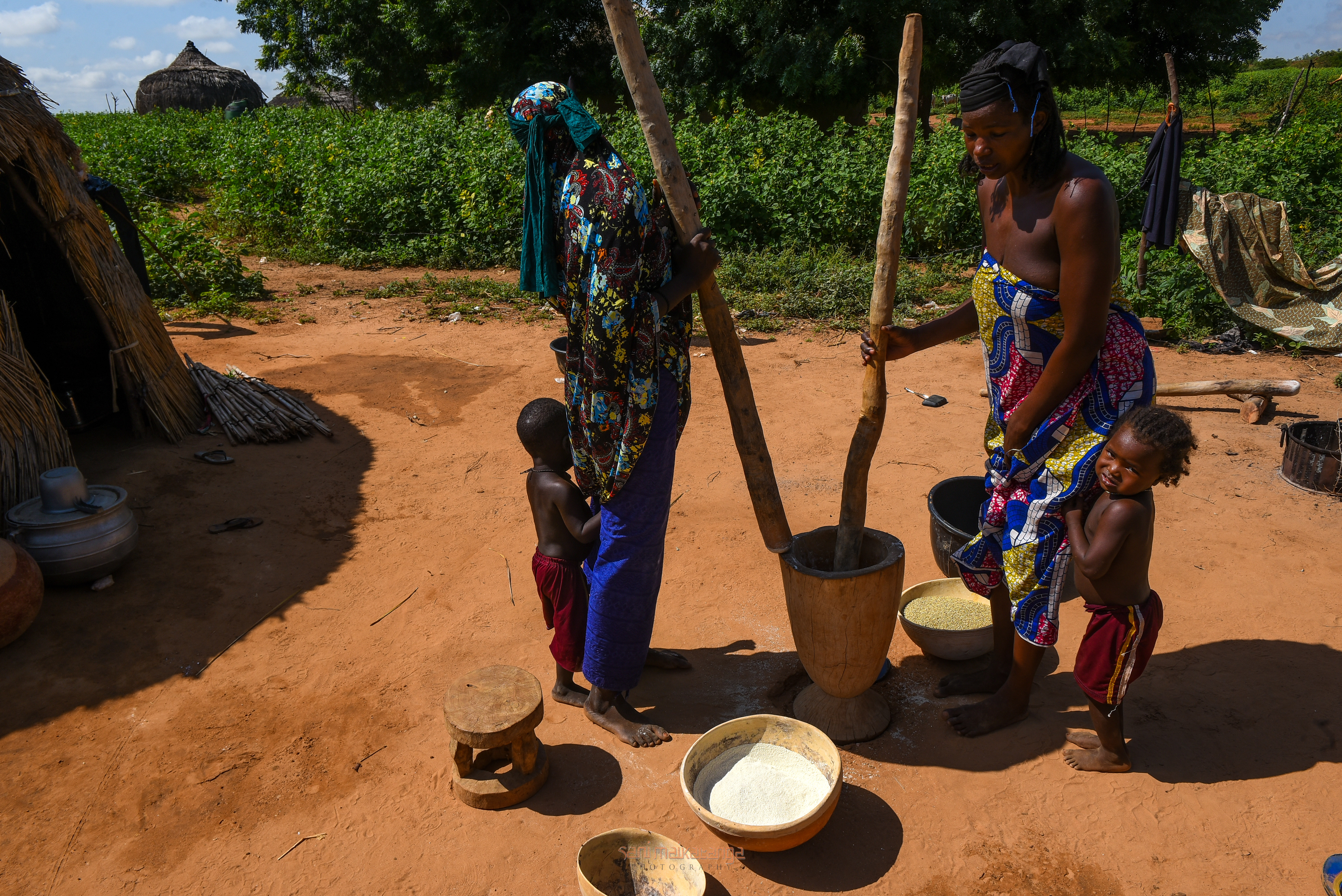
Fulani village
